Otamarakau is a beach and community in the Western Bay of Plenty District and Bay of Plenty Region of New Zealand's North Island, just south of Pukehina.

The New Zealand Ministry for Culture and Heritage gives a translation of "place of young warriors" for Ōtamarākau.

Ōtamarākau Marae and its Waitahanui a Hei meeting house are a traditional meeting place for the people of Ngati Makino. The modern waterfront marae has accommodation and a full commercial kitchen. They host corporate meetings, Annual General Meetings, Special General Meetings, Wananga, family reunions, noho marae, weddings, birthdays, camps, schools and more for local, national and international visitors.

In 2018, stormwater laden with sediment flowed over the Otamarakau wetlands from two ponds constructed without sufficient planning approval. In January 2020, kiwifruit company Bay Gold was fined over the incident.

A speed camera was installed on the highway through Otamarakau in 2018, leading to $30,000 of fines in its first month of operation.

Education

The school's main annual fundraising event is a surf fishing competition.

References

Western Bay of Plenty District
Beaches of the Bay of Plenty Region
Populated places in the Bay of Plenty Region